Turkey pea is a common name for several plants and may refer to:

Dicentra canadensis, native to eastern North America
Erigenia bulbosa, native to eastern North America
Sanicula tuberosa, native to western North America
Tephrosia virginiana, native to eastern North America